Joseph Holdsworth (6 December 1789 – 18 April 1857) was a British Whig politician.

Holdsworth was elected a Whig Member of Parliament for Wakefield at the 1841 general election but, as he was also the returning officer at that election, he was unseated the next year in favour of his Conservative opponent, William Lascelles.

References

External links
 

UK MPs 1841–1847
Whig (British political party) MPs for English constituencies
1789 births
1857 deaths